Walter Raymond Crickmer (1900 – 6 February 1958) was an English football club secretary and manager.

He became Manchester United club secretary in 1926. He twice assumed managerial responsibility: from 1 April 1931 to 1 June 1932, and then again from 1 August 1937 to 1 February 1945.

Together with club owner James W. Gibson, he was responsible for instituting the youth development system at Manchester United. After 32 years of service as club secretary, Crickmer was killed in the Munich air disaster on 6 February 1958. He is buried at Stretford Cemetery.

He was married to Nellie Robertson from 1921 until his death. She outlived him by nine years, dying in 1967. They had one daughter, Beryl, who was born in 1921.

Managerial statistics

References

External links
 

1900 births
1958 deaths
English football managers
Manchester United F.C. managers
People from Wigan
Victims of the Munich air disaster